St. Elijah's Church is a church in Stegopull, Gjirokastër County, Albania. It is a Cultural Monument of Albania.

The church is part of the monastery dedicated to the same Saint.

References

Cultural Monuments of Albania
Buildings and structures in Libohovë